1778 Alfvén, also designated , is a carbonaceous Themistian asteroid from the outer region of the asteroid belt, approximately 20 kilometers in diameter.

It was discovered on 26 September 1960, by astronomers Cornelis van Houten, Ingrid van Houten-Groeneveld and Tom Gehrels at the U.S. Palomar Observatory, in California. It was later named after Swedish Nobelist Hannes Alfvén.

Orbit and classification 

The dark C-type asteroid is a member of the Themis family, a dynamical family of outer-belt asteroids with nearly coplanar ecliptical orbits. Alfvén orbits the Sun in the outer main-belt at a distance of 2.7–3.6 AU once every 5 years and 7 months (2,038 days). Its orbit has an eccentricity of 0.13 and an inclination of 2° with respect to the ecliptic.

A first precovery was taken at Lowell Observatory in 1906, extending the body's observation arc by 54 years prior to its official discovery observation.

Physical characteristics

Rotation period 

In February 2013, two rotational lightcurves of Alfvén were obtained from analysis at the Palomar Transient Factory in California. The lightcurves gave a rotation period of 4.82 and 4.8050 hours with a brightness variation of 0.40 and 0.36 magnitude, respectively.

Diameter and albedo 

According to the survey carried out by NASA's Wide-field Infrared Survey Explorer with its subsequent NEOWISE mission, Alfvén measures 20.62 kilometers in diameter and its surface has an albedo of 0.095, while the Collaborative Asteroid Lightcurve Link assumes an albedo of 0.08 and calculates a diameter of 20.51 kilometers with an absolute magnitude of 11.8.

Survey designation 

The survey designation "P-L" stands for Palomar–Leiden, named after Palomar Observatory and Leiden Observatory, which collaborated on the fruitful Palomar–Leiden survey in the 1960s. Gehrels used Palomar's Samuel Oschin telescope (also known as the 48-inch Schmidt Telescope), and shipped the photographic plates to Ingrid and Cornelis van Houten at Leiden Observatory where astrometry was carried out. The trio are credited with the discovery of several thousand minor planets.

Naming 

This minor planet was named after Swedish engineer, physicist and Nobel prize winner, Hannes Alfvén (1908–1995). The official  was published by the Minor Planet Center on 15 June 1974.

References

External links 
 Asteroid Lightcurve Database (LCDB), query form (info )
 Dictionary of Minor Planet Names, Google books
 Asteroids and comets rotation curves, CdR – Observatoire de Genève, Raoul Behrend
 Discovery Circumstances: Numbered Minor Planets (1)-(5000) – Minor Planet Center
 
 

001778
Discoveries by Ingrid van Houten-Groeneveld
Discoveries by Cornelis Johannes van Houten
Discoveries by Tom Gehrels
4506
Named minor planets
19600926